Ficatelli or Figatelli is an Italian surname. Notable people with the surname include:

 Giuseppe Maria Figatelli (1611–1682), Italian mathematician
 Giuseppe Maria Ficatelli (1639–1703), Italian painter
 Stefano Felice Ficatelli (1686–1771), Italian painter 

Italian-language surnames